Nicolás Valentini (born 6 April 2001) is an Argentine footballer currently playing as a centre-back for Boca Juniors.

Career statistics

Club

Notes

Honours
Boca Juniors
Supercopa Argentina: 2022

References

2001 births
Living people
Argentine footballers
Association football defenders
People from Junín, Buenos Aires
Argentine Primera División players
Boca Juniors footballers
Aldosivi footballers
Sportspeople from Buenos Aires Province